The ALA Rainbow List is an annual list of "books with significant gay, lesbian, bisexual, or transgender content, and which are aimed at youth, birth through age 18" produced by the American Library Association's (ALA's) Rainbow Project, which is run by the ALA's Rainbow Round Table and Social Responsibilities Round Table.

Although roughly 4.5 percent of the U.S. population identifies as LGBT, "the vast majority of libraries lack high-quality, comprehensive LGBT collections" and "satisfaction among LGBT patrons is low." To ensure libraries have adequate LGBT books for readers of all ages, librarians should rely on resources such as the ALA's Rainbow List and the Lambda Literary Foundation.

Honorees

See also 
 Stonewall Awards

Notes

References

External links
 

American Library Association awards
Young adult literature awards
LGBT literary awards
English-language literary awards
American literary awards
Lists of LGBT-related mass media
Lists of books